The 2019 ToyotaCare 250 was a NASCAR Xfinity Series race held on April 12, 2019, at Richmond Raceway in Richmond, Virginia. Contested over 250 laps on the 0.75 mile (1.2 km) asphalt short track, it was the eighth race of the 2019 NASCAR Xfinity Series season. This was the season's second Dash 4 Cash race.

Background

Track

Richmond Raceway is a 3/4-mile (1.2 km), D-shaped, asphalt race track located just outside Richmond, Virginia in Henrico County. It hosts the Monster Energy NASCAR Cup Series and Xfinity Series. Known as "America's premier short track", it formerly hosted a NASCAR Gander Outdoors Truck Series race, an IndyCar Series race, and two USAC sprint car races. Richmond Raceway is also one of only a few tracks to host all of its events at night.

Dash 4 Cash
At this race, Christopher Bell, Tyler Reddick, Cole Custer, and Chase Briscoe were the four drivers eligible for the Dash 4 Cash extra prize money as they placed in the top 4 in the previous race.

Entry list
Amongst the drivers entered for the race were Elliott Sadler, a previously dominant driver in the series who came out of retirement for the race, and three drivers all making their Xfinity debuts: Dillon Bassett, Tyler Matthews and Colin Garrett.

Practice

Qualifying
Qualifying was canceled due to rain, so the starting lineup was determined by owner's points standings at the time of the race, giving the pole to Riley Herbst.

Qualifying results

 Morgan Shepherd initially qualified for the race, but withdrew so that Kaz Grala's fully funded 21 would qualify for the race.

. – Eligible for Dash 4 Cash prize money

Race

Summary
Riley Herbst began on pole, but quickly lost the lead after two laps. Mason Diaz brought out the first caution after receiving a flat tire, eliminating him from the race. Christopher Bell led the most laps during stage 1, but Justin Allgaier managed to overtake him and win the stage. Bell spun out after contact from John Hunter Nemechek, but saved it. Noah Gragson also got tapped by Kaz Grala, but did not accumulate significant damage. Cole Custer overtook Allgaier, who pitted off-sequence with the others. Custer then won stage 2 and led the most laps. 

Bell had issues on pit road after Nemechek spun out David Starr, causing him to fall behind. Austin Cindric briefly took the lead for seven laps after a caution caused by an accident involving Gragson, Grala, Gray Gaulding, and Justin Haley. Custer won the race after overtaking and holding off Cindric, also getting the extra Dash 4 Cash prize money.

At the next race, Custer, Cindric, Allgaier, and Tyler Reddick would be eligible for Dash 4 Cash.

Stage Results

Stage One
Laps: 75

Stage Two
Laps: 75

Final Stage Results

Stage Three
Laps: 100

. – Won the Dash 4 Cash prize money and subsequently qualified for the Dash 4 Cash prize money in the next race.

. – Qualified for Dash 4 Cash prize money in the next race.

References

NASCAR races at Richmond Raceway
ToyotaCare 250
ToyotaCare 250
2019 NASCAR Xfinity Series